American singer and actress Sofia Carson has released one studio album, five soundtrack albums, one extended play (EP), fourteen singles (including two singles as a featured artist), eleven promotional singles and twenty three music videos.

Albums

Studio albums

Soundtrack albums

Extended plays

Singles

As lead artist

As featured artist

Promotional singles

Other charted songs

Other appearances

Music videos

References

Notes

Sources

Discography
Discographies of American artists
Pop music discographies